Fernand Bauduin (30 September 1894 – 31 July 1951) was a French middle-distance runner. He competed in the men's 800 metres at the 1920 Summer Olympics.

References

External links
 

1894 births
1951 deaths
Athletes (track and field) at the 1920 Summer Olympics
French male middle-distance runners
Olympic athletes of France
Place of birth missing